Cookin' with Coolio is a web-based cooking instruction program which starred West Coast rapper Coolio. The show is an offshoot of his reality show Coolio's Rules. It appears on the web video network My Damn Channel and is produced by Dead Crow Pictures. The show is also a promotion for a cookbook by Coolio of the same name.

About the host

Cookin with Coolio was hosted by Artis Leon Ivey Jr. (August 1, 1963 – September 28, 2022), better known by the stage name Coolio. Coolio was an American Grammy Award-winning musician, rapper, actor, and record producer. He was best known for the Grammy Award-winning song "Gangsta's Paradise", and the theme song for Kenan & Kel, a Nickelodeon show from 1996 to 2000.

Coolio often referred to himself as the "ghetto Martha Stewart" and the "black Rachael Ray." He started cooking when he was young, and learned with simple ingredients as he lacked basic necessities to prepare elaborate dishes.

References

External links
 
Cookin' with Coolio at Slate.com
Cookin' with Coolio at Amazon.com

American cooking websites